James Charles Kearney  (4 April 1920 – 1 October 1998) was a New Zealand international rugby union player. He was a member of the All Blacks in 1947 and 1949, playing in the First five-eighth position.

Early life
Kearney was born in Naseby, New Zealand and educated at St. Kevin's College, Oamaru where he played rugby for the school.

Senior rugby
Kearney played for the Ranfurly club and represented Otago in 1939, 1941 and 1947–1948. In 1942 he played for the Brigade club and represented Canterbury. In 1943 he was playing for the Canterbury Yoemanry Cavalry club and in that year represented Ashburton County. He played for the South Island Team in 1947 and 1948 and was a New Zealand trialist in both those years. He played rugby for the army in the 2nd New Zealand Expeditionary Force in 1945 and 1946. In the Kiwi army team he played only 11 of 38 matches because of injury. But he did play in the Scottish international.

All Black
Kearney was selected for the 1947 All Blacks and toured Australia, playing in the second test, and South Africa in 1949, playing in the first three tests. In the 22 matches (4 tests) he played as an All Black, Kearney scored 30 points for New Zealand (6 tries and 4 dropped goals) and 9 test points (1 try and 2 dropped goals).

References

1920 births
1998 deaths
New Zealand international rugby union players
New Zealand rugby union players
People educated at St Kevin's College, Oamaru
People from Naseby, New Zealand
Rugby union fly-halves
Otago rugby union players